Many of the newspapers founded in the area that is now the state of Minnesota became Defunct newspapers of Minnesota when they ceased to be published for a variety of reasons.  The earliest known newspaper, The Minnesota Weekly Democrat, was founded while the area was part of the Louisiana Purchase in 1803.  According to records of the Library of Congress, there have been throughout its history almost 4,000 newspaper titles in the current area of the state of Minnesota, which was founded in 1858.  These include newspapers in English, German, Swedish, Russian and other languages, as well as Native American newspapers.  There were approximately 500 newspapers in Minnesota at the beginning of 2020.

Defunct newspapers
The following are some of the notable defunct newspapers:

Selected defunct newspaper covers

References

 

 Defunct Newspapers of Minnesota
Minnesota